The Zeroids were a line of toy robots from the Planet Zero introduced by the Ideal Toy Company in 1967 and re-licensed by Toyfinity in 2013 along with the later "STAR Team" revival. Consisting of Zerak, Zintar and Zobor, the Zeroids powered their way into the imaginations of young boys for nearly a decade.
Zeroid robots were powered by a small DC electric motor that could be removed. These DC motors appeared as the brand name "Motorific" in Ideal Corp racing slot cars, and "Boaterific" powered scale motorboats.

The original sales pitch read, "Moving across the landscape, overrunning all obstacles as inexorably as the Future itself, these amazing, efficient and powerful automatons have but one purpose - to serve their masters at work and play!"

The storage cases in which the robots came could be used for other purposes. The robots were battery operated, and had wheels with rubber treads to propel themselves across the floor. There was a bottom mounted reversing switch that would allow the robot to reverse when it touched a special plastic plate, or turn the robot off, when in backed up into its display case.

Zerak, the blue robot, was originally the "commander" of the three robots. Zerak came with hook hands, and interchangeable magnetic hand and a throwing cup hand. Zerak's right arm could be cocked, and made to throw objects.

Zobor, the "Bronze" Robot, could "transport" lightweight items in his storage case, which could be "transformed" into a wagon due to having wheels attached to it. The case/wagon could be latched to a hook on Zobor's base. Zobor had a throwing arm and special spring-loaded plier type clamp hands.

Zintar, the silver "explorer", could use his storage case as a sled-like vehicle, which was propelled by his own treads. Zintar had a throwing arm and special hands with spring-loaded opposable thumbs. Zintar was cast in both a silver sparkled plastic and also in plain light gray plastic.

Later, "Zogg", a green robot was added to the set, and replaced Zerak as the commander of the zeroids. Zogg had powered drive treds, and was the first zeroid with an internal light bulb. Zogg did not have a throwing arm. Zogg had a sophisticated-looking "station" which had movable parts, activated by Zogg's metal "hands" completing an electric circuit.  The station had, among other things, a "radar" that would rotate, and a spiral design 'monitor" which would spin when Zogg would complete the electric circuit.

An "Action Set" was available with a  Missile Defense Pad, launching station, and included a "Solar Cycle" hollow wheel, into which the zeroid robot could be set inside.

The Zeroid alien robot was a box shaped robot with a clear dome head and powered drive. It had changeable internal nylon gears that would alter the robots movements with pre-programmed patterns. One pattern ended with the robots "exploding" with the arms and parts springing off.

There was a brief distribution of a Zeroid flying saucer called the ZEM XXI Explorer Module, cast in yellow and purple, or yellow and green, with a full sized powered Zeroid inside.

Zeroids were later packaged without their case, on a bubble card with and without a solar cycle.

Foreign distribution (U.K.) of Zeroids included a figure called Zemo, a composite robot with a Zintar head, Zerak chest and Zobor body. Zemo was sold in a wagon type carry case similar to the Zobor robot. Zemo was cast in aqua, red or orange-yellow plastic versions. Only twelve promotional Zemo's were ever manufactured with names printed on them. These were all aqua in colour and given as gifts to senior staff. A few made their way into general distribution in the U.K. and are considered by Zeroid collectors to be the "Holiest of Holy Grails". Only two intact examples are still known to exist.

Late 1970s "Star Team" Revival
Zeroids returned to the shelves in the late 1970s, renamed "Star Team", to capitalize on the success of Star Wars.

The Star Team line featured the "Zeroid Pilot", a smaller R2-D2-style dome-headed robot. Made from the lower body mold of the Zogg figure, it did not have the motorific DC drive motor. The batteries only powered a dome light. The "Pilot" was cast in silver plastic, in red or blue trim, and without the electronic contacts in the arms.

The ZEM XXI Flying Saucer was re-issued as the "Star Hawk" in red and grey plastic, with a non-powered Zeroid with red trim.

The other star team robot was a humanoid "Zem 21" green-headed silver-bodied figure that bore some resemblance to C-3PO. They fought the Darth-Vader-esque "Knight of Darkness", which was an Ideal Captain Action body molded in black.

2010 Moonstone Books Revival

In 2010, the Zeroids returned in the pages of Moonstone Books' original comic book series in association with Captain Action Enterprises. 
"The original robots from space have returned to Earth! The Zeroids robots are back  to help save mankind! Returning after a decades-long exile, the Zeroids return to find the descendant of their creator Professor Zero. Destiny Zero, a female college sophomore, needs all the help she can get as her world is overrun by the alien Shadow Raiders and their evil Zombies."

"Now, in much like an action movie version of Dorothy and her friends from OZ, Destiny unites with Zintar,Zerak, Zobor and Zogg to combine the fun retro appeal of nostalgic robots with cutting edge explosive adventure!"

2016 Toyfinity Revival

As part of their licensing package in 2013, Toyfinity acquired the rights to Robo Force, Manglor, Rocks & Bugs & Things, and Zeroids/STAR Team from former Ideal Toy Company. Compatible with the Glyos System Series designed by Onell Design, the kits mixed Robo Force kits featuring 41 or more pieces with Zeroids kits featuring 16 or more pieces with a figure which can be arranged and re-arranged in any way the user sees fit. Key philosophical differences between Zintar and Zerak, without the firm claws of Commander Zogg to guide them, have led to different evolutionary paths for these mechanical wonders. The tribes of the Prime Zeroids have gone their own ways, interacting very little over the interceding years. Guidance under the gaze of Zintar pushed their advancement into Neo Zeroids.

Figures
Zeroids
 Ancient Constructs - Ancient mechanical beings from beyond the stars
 Creator - A Gold deluxe figure with no paint applications. An 82 piece kit was offered online November 6, 2015.
 Worker - A Bronze deluxe figure with no paint applications. An 82 piece kit was offered online November 6, 2015.
 Nazgar - The Tyrant
 Super Zeroid Black and Technician Zeroid with secret NAZGAR the TYRANT hidden mode - Metallic Black with Red paint applications. A 58 piece kit. Released online February 7, 2016.
 Zeroid Striker - Metallic Black with Red paint applications. A 41 piece kit. Released online February 7, 2016.
 Phospectre Parakonan - Glow-in-the-Dark Green with several paint applications. A 38 piece kit. Released online August 21, 2022.
 Phospectre Zerkanoid Questionian Bytes - Glow-in-the-Dark Green with several paint applications. A 26 piece kit. Released online August 21, 2022.
Neo Zeroids
 Neo Zeroid Assassin - Metallic Black with Red paint applications. A 16 piece kit. Released online February 7, 2016.
 Neo Zeroid Hunter - Crimson Red with Black paint applications. A 16 piece kit. Released online June 24, 2016.
 Neo Zeroid Protector - White with Black paint applications. A 16 piece kit. Released online September 25, 2016.
 Neo Zeroid Stealth - Clear with no paint applications and bonus Nazareen brain. A 17 piece kit. Released online December 28, 2016.
 Neo Zeroid Zintar - Grey with several paint applications and new tampos. A 16 piece kit. Combine with Robo Force's Maxx Zeroid to make Super Zeroid. Released online August 20, 2017.
 Neo Zeroid Zobor - Metallic Copper with several paint applications and new tampos. A 16 piece kit. Combine with Robo Force's Maxx Zobor to make Super Zeroid Zobor. Released online January 17, 2018.
 Neo Zeroid Zerak - Classic Deep Blue with several paint applications and new tampos. A 16 piece kit. Combine with Robo Force's Destroyer Maxx Zero to make Super Destroyer. Released online May 13, 2018.
 Neo Zeroid Zemo - Hunter Orange with several paint applications and tampos. A 16 piece kit. Released online August 16, 2018.
 Neo Zeroid M. Zeroid - Translucent neon pink with no paint applications. A 16 piece kit. Released online May 10, 2019.
 Neo Zeroid Zault - Aqua-Green with several paint applications and new tampo. A 17 piece kit. Released online February 19, 2021.
 Phospectre Neo Zeroid Buster - Glow-in-the-Dark Green with several paint applications. A 16 piece kit. Released online August 21, 2022.
 Cerulestar Neo Zeroid Explorer VIII - Glow-in-the-Dark Blue with several paint applications. A 16 piece kit. Released online August 21, 2022.
 Test Shot Zeroid - Pink Fleshtone with no paint applications. A 15 piece kit. Exclusive to Club Zeton members. Shipped in December 2015.
Knight of Darkness and the Shadow Warriors
 Knight of Darkness
 Special Crossover Edition - Black with Silver paint applications. Crossover edition with Onell Design. A 45 piece kit. Released online January 17, 2018.
 Cult of Dred Edition - Black with Silver paint applications and multiple new tampos. Crossover edition with Onell Design. A 45 piece kit. Released online October 4, 2019.
 Knight of Illumination
 Special Crossover Edition - White with Gold paint applications. Crossover edition with Onell Design. A 50 piece kit. Released online May 13, 2018.
 Darkness Soldier
 Standard - Crimson Red with White paint applications. A 34 piece kit. Released online June 24, 2016.
 Legion - White with Black paint applications. A 34 piece kit. Released online September 25, 2016.
 Guardian - Black with Silver paint applications. A 34 piece kit. Released online January 17, 2018.
 Destroyer - Classic Deep Blue with Black paint applications. A 34 piece kit. Released online May 13, 2018.
 Solar Storm - Orange with White paint applications. A 34 piece kit. Released online October 4, 2019.
 Metallic Copper - Metallic Copper with Silver paint applications. Head-only. Use to enhance other figures such as Zobor, Maxx Zobor, and other Gendrone Union colorway figures. Released online January 17, 2018.

References

External links
 http://gamesandbeyond.com/zeroid/zeroid.html
 http://www.zeroidz.com/Zeroids.html
 http://icv2.com/articles/news/12923.html
 https://web.archive.org/web/20080516094112/http://www.wildtoys.com/zeroids/index.asp
 http://www.facebook.com/home.php#!/pages/Zeroids/229887473030
 https://web.archive.org/web/20101228104930/http://moonstonebooks.com/zero.asp
 http://www.marvunapp.com/Appendix5/starteam.htm

Products introduced in 1967
1960s toys
Ideal Toy Company